Kate Petty (born Katharine Chapman, 9 June 1951 – 22 May 2007) was a British author of children's books.

Born in Welwyn Garden City, she studied at York University before becoming an editor at Jonathan Cape. One of her most successful publications was The Great Grammar Book, which was illustrated by Jennie Maizels. She was a prolific author, writing nearly 100 books, mostly non-fiction picture books for children.

She died in St Austell of cancer.

References 

1951 births
2007 deaths
British women children's writers